The Heartland Conference was a collegiate athletic conference affiliated with the National Collegiate Athletic Association (NCAA)'s Division II level, which was founded in 1999. The majority of members were in Texas, with additional members in Arkansas, Kansas, and Oklahoma. The conference office was located in Waco, Texas.

History
The conference was formed in 1999 by founding members Drury University, University of the Incarnate Word, Lincoln University, Rockhurst University, St. Edward's University, St. Mary's University and Texas Wesleyan University. Oklahoma Panhandle State University and Dallas Baptist University joined in 2002. Founding members Drury and Rockhurst left the Heartland Conference to join the Great Lakes Valley Conference (GLVC) in 2005. Western New Mexico University and Montana State University - Billings joined in 2005. However, WNMU re-joined the Rocky Mountain Athletic Conference in 2006 and MSUB joined the Great Northwest Athletic Conference in 2007. Newman University, Texas A&M International University and the University of Texas of the Permian Basin joined the conference in 2006, making the transition from NAIA to NCAA Division II. The University of Arkansas – Fort Smith joined the conference in the Fall of 2009 after transitioning from the NJCAA. In the fall of 2010, Lincoln left for the Mid-America Intercollegiate Athletics Association and Incarnate Word left for the Lone Star Conference. In July 2011, McMurry University announced that it had been accepted as candidate for D-II membership and would join the Heartland Conference in the fall of 2012. In February 2012, Oklahoma Christian University announced its intention to seek membership in NCAA Division II. In Spring 2012, Rogers State University, a member of the NAIA Sooner Athletic Conference, applied for membership. The conference confirmed in July 2012 that Oklahoma Christian's teams would play full conference schedules starting in Fall 2012 and that Rogers State and Lubbock Christian University would begin conference play in 2013-14.

On August 30, 2017, the Lone Star Conference announced that eight of the nine members of the Heartland Conference would join in fall 2019; the remaining member, Newman, announced it would seek other affiliation at that time. On February 8, 2018, Newman announced that it would become an associate member of the Mid-America Intercollegiate Athletics Association beginning in the 2019–20 season.
On October 18, 2018 Rogers State decided to join the MIAA instead of the Lone Star.

Chronological timeline
 1999 - The Heartland Conference was founded. Charter members included Drury College (now Drury University), the University of the Incarnate Word, Lincoln University of Missouri, Rockhurst College (now Rockhurst University), St. Edwards University, St. Mary's University and Texas Wesleyan University beginning the 1999-2000 academic year.
 2002 - Dallas Baptist University and Oklahoma Panhandle State University joined the Heartland in the 2002-03 academic year.
 2005 - Drury and Rockhurst to join the Great Lakes Valley Conference (GLVC) after the 2004-05 academic year.
 2005 - Montana State University at Billings and Western New Mexico University joined the Heartland in the 2005-06 academic year.
 2006 - Western New Mexico left the Heartland to join the Rocky Mountain Athletic Conference (RMAC) after the 2005-06 academic year.
 2006 - Newman University, the University of Texas of the Permian Basin (Texas–Permian Basin or UTPB) and Texas A&M International University (TAMIU)
 2007 - Montana State–Billings left the Heartland to join the Great Northwest Athletic Conference (GNAC) after the 2006-07 academic year.
 2009 - The University of Arkansas at Fort Smith (Arkansas–Fort Smith or UAFS) joined the Heartland in the 2009-10 academic year.
 2010 - Two institutions left the Heartland to join their respective new home primary conferences: Incarnate Word (UIW) to the Lone Star Conference (LSC), and Lincoln (Mo.) to return to the Mid-America Intercollegiate Athletics Association (MIAA), both effective after the 2009-10 academic year.
 2012 - McMurry University and Oklahoma Christian University joined the Heartland in the 2012-13 academic year.
 2013 - Lubbock Christian University and Rogers State University joined the Heartland in the 2013-14 academic year.
 2016 - Texas–Permian Basin (UTPB) left the Heartland to join the Lone Starly after the 2015-16 academic year. However, it would remain in the Heartland as an affiliate member for men's soccer beginning the 2016 fall season (2016-17 academic year).
 2016 - Eastern New Mexico University, Midwestern State University and West Texas A&M University joined the Heartland as affiliate member for men's soccer in the 2016 fall season (2016-17 academic year).
 2019 - The Heartland ceased operations as an athletic conference after the 2018-19 academic year; as many schools left to join their respective new home primary conferences beginning the 2019-20 academic year: Arkansas–Fort Smith (UAFS), Dallas Baptist, Lubbock Christian, Oklahoma Christian, St. Edward's (Tex.), St. Mary's (Tex.) and Texas A&M International (TAMIU) joined the Lone Star to renew their rivalries with Texas–Permian Basin and Western New Mexico; while Newman (Ks.) and Rogers State joined the MIAA to renew their rivalries with Lincoln (Mo.); and men's soccer affiliates Eastern New Mexico, Midwestern State, Texas–Permian Basin (UTPB) and West Texas A&M returned to their primary home conference once the Lone Star began to re-sponsor the sport.

Member schools

Final members
The Heartland had nine final full members, all but three were private schools:

Notes

Final affiliate members
The Heartland had four final affiliate members, all were public schools:

Notes

Prior full members
The Heartland had ten former full members, half were public schools and another half were private schools:

Notes

Membership timeline

Sports

Dallas Baptist's baseball team competed in NCAA Division I for much of its Heartland Conference tenure. At the time the league disbanded, the Patriots were single-sport members of the Missouri Valley Conference.

The Heartland Conference sponsored 13 sports, seven for women and six for men.

Men's sponsored sports by school

Women's sponsored sports by school

Other sponsored sports by school

‡ — D-I sport

National championships

Arkansas-Fort Smith (as Westark Junior College) won the 1981 National Junior College Athletic Association (NJACC) men's basketball national championship.

St. Mary's won NAIA national championships in Softball (1986) and Men's Basketball (1989).

St. Mary's Men's Golf team was named the Golf Coaches Association of America 2008-2009 Academic National Champions, which St. Mary's treats as a fifth team national.

Dallas Baptist won the 2003 National Christian College Athletic Association Baseball national championship.

Lubbock Christian won NAIA national championships in Baseball (1983 & 2009) and Softball (2008).

References

 
Sports in Laredo, Texas
Sports organizations established in 1999
1999 establishments in the United States
Sports leagues disestablished in 2019